Hamza Elbuhaisi is a Palestinian journalist, author and researcher. 
As shown in the links, he has reported for media outlets, like Mominoun Without Borders, VJ Movement, Elaph, Alaraby TV, Iraqi Albaghdadiya TV channel, Watania News Agency.

He awarded the Arabic Journalism Award in Dubai, 2011. His blog nominated as one of the top ten Arabic blogs in The Deutsche Welle International Blog Awards 2012.

Background
He was born in Gaza 1985. In 2011 he moved to the UK to continue his academic studies.

Books

Religious books 
 Pure clarity in the knowledge of revelation, 2021. (In Arabic)
 The Secrets Collector of the Steadfast Creator about the Creation and Material in the Holy Quran, 2023. (In Arabic)

Fiction:
 A grenade and an orange "story collection" 2019. (In Arabic) 
 Death at the Gates of Nazareth, “story collection” 2021. (In Arabic)

Awards
His personal blog was nominated as one of the top ten Arabic blogs in The Deutsche Welle International Blog Awards.

He awarded the Arabic Journalism 2011 award.

Years ago he awarded the Prize of Reuters Murdered Journalist Fadel Shanaa for radio feature in Gaza.

References

External links
 https://hamzaelbuhaisi.net
 https://www.goodreads.com/author/show/18741902._Hamza_Elbuhaisi
 https://mdx.academia.edu/HamzaElbuhaisi
 https://www.researchgate.net/profile/Hamza_Elbuhaisi
https://www.academia.edu/68282411/Understanding_the_revelation_in_the_Quranic_text_and_accepting_its_phenomenon_among_Arabs_through_the_jinn_and_the_culture_of_poetry_and_its_perceptions
 https://www.academia.edu/45534933/Understanding_the_issue_of_polygamy_in_the_Quranic_context_Hermeneutic_Approach
https://www.academia.edu/45534566/Citizenship_rights_between_the_religious_context_in_Islam_and_the_Universal_Declaration_of_Human_Rights
https://www.academia.edu/68279168/The_role_of_consensus_in_developing_the_Shura_process_to_reform_the_legal_and_judicial_system_in_the_Islamic_state 
 https://www.academia.edu/45534667/The_role_of_jurisprudence_in_determining_the_shape_of_the_Islamic_system
https://www.researchgate.net/publication/349988610_The_role_of_consensus_in_developing_the_Shura_process_to_reform_the_legal_and_judicial_system_in_the_Islamic_state
 https://www.mominoun.com/articles/الفلسفة-الإنسانية-لمفهوم-الفداء-في-النص-القرآني-من-منظور-عقلاني-7515
 https://www.mominoun.com/articles/فهم-تأويلي-لمسألة-تعدد-الزوجات-في-النص-القرآني-7323
 https://hamzaelbuhaisi.net/2021/07/07/الحركة-في-اللطميات-الحسينية-كضابط-إيق/
 https://ma3azef.com/إيقاع-اللطميات-الحسينية/
 https://www.alaraby.co.uk/entertainment/2018/2/11/رياض-البندك-سيرة-لحن-منسي-1
 http://www.aljazeera.net/NR/exeres/A537CE35-8750-4B34-9AE1-3896DEFFC8F2.htm
 http://www.maannews.net/arb/ViewDetails.aspx?ID=160509

Year of birth missing (living people)
Palestinian journalists
Living people